Baba Khani (also Romanized as Bābā Khānī and Bāba Khūni) is a village in Dorud Rural District, in the Central District of Dorud County, Lorestan Province, Iran. At the 2006 census, its population was 280, in 66 families.

References 

Towns and villages in Dorud County